Mipus crebrilamellosus is a species of sea snail, a marine gastropod mollusk in the subfamily Coralliophilinae, the coral snails, within the family Muricidae, the murex snails and rock snails.

Description
The size of an adult shell varies between 15 mm and 25 mm.

Distribution
This species occurs in the Pacific Ocean off Japan and off Southeast Asia.

References

External links
 

crebrilamellosus
Gastropods described in 1913